Fry sauce is a condiment often served with French fries or tostones (twice-fried plantain slices) in many places in the world. It is usually a combination of one part tomato ketchup and two parts mayonnaise. Historically, the Argentinian salsa golf is most likely the first ketchup and mayonnaise sauce, having been invented in the 1920s by Luis Leloir.

In the United States

Although sauce composed of a mixture of equal parts ketchup and mayonnaise appears in a New Orleans cookbook published in 1900, fry sauce was popularized in Utah. It may have first appeared there in 1955 at Stan's Drive-In, which was then a franchise of Arctic Circle. Another possible origin for fry sauce was the "pink sauce" served in 1941 at Don Carlos Barbecue in Salt Lake City.  In his essay on Utah fry sauce, Michael P. Christensen noted that fry sauce "functions as a cultural identifier for Utahns."  The Arctic Circle chain still serves fry sauce in its western United States restaurants.

In April 2018, Heinz announced the release of "Mayochup", a mixture of the two sauces, because 500,000+ users voted "yes" in a Twitter poll asking Americans if they wanted to see it in stores.  A number of Twitter users responded that such a mixture already existed as "fry sauce" and "fancy sauce". The sauce arrived at U.S. retailers' shelves in September 2018.

The sauce is also closely related to Yum Yum sauce, which is popular in Japanese steakhouses in America.

Outside the United States
According to tradition, the sauce was invented by Luis Federico Leloir, a Nobel laureate and restaurant patron, at a golf club in Mar del Plata, Argentina, during the mid-1920s. 

In France, many Turkish restaurants and fast food establishments serve fry sauce and call it ; it is also common for customers to request  (a dab of mayonnaise and a dab of ketchup) alongside their French fries at such places. Both sauce cocktail and the Thousand Island dressing-like sauce cocktail can often be found in supermarkets.

In Germany, a popular product called  (red white) is sold in toothpaste-style tubes; it consists of unmixed ketchup and mayonnaise, which form a red-and-white striped string when squeezed out. Fries at restaurants are sometimes served with an equal mixture of ketchup and mayonnaise.

In Iceland, a condiment similar to fry sauce called  (cocktail sauce) is popular.

In the Philippines, a similar sauce is made by combining mayonnaise and banana ketchup. It is commonly used as a dipping sauce for fried food like french fries and cheese sticks (deep fried cheese wrapped in lumpia wrapper) but also for appetizers like lumpia.

In the United Kingdom, more specifically, London, this sauce is known as "burger sauce", and is served in one of two ways:

 Premixed, similarly to the photos above;
 Separate, but together, similar to the Turkish . The ketchup is put in the container followed by the mayonnaise, and is mixed by hand by the consumer, using the desired foodstuffs to mix them together as it is dipped.
It is made of two parts ketchup and one part mayonnaise with the addition of garlic.

See also

 Comeback sauce
 
 Fritessaus
 List of dips
 List of sauces
 Marie Rose sauce
 Mayochup
 Pink sauce
 Remoulade
 Russian dressing
 Secret sauce
 Special sauce
 Thousand Island dressing

References

Further reading
 "The creators of fry sauce turn 60" — KSL.com
 "Fry sauce and Arctic Circle hit big 6-0" — Deseret News
 "My search for the truth: Who invented Utah’s fry sauce?" — Deseret News

External links

 Fry Sauce Article at About.com
 Fry Sauce Recipe

Sauces
Mayonnaise
Ketchup
Utah cuisine
American condiments
Food and drink in Idaho

is:Kokkteilsósa